Tooth & Nail is a 2013 studio album by folk musician Billy Bragg.

Track listing

Personnel
Billy Bragg – acoustic guitar, vocals
Greg Leisz – acoustic guitar, pedal steel, mandolin
David Piltch – bass, upright bass
Patrick Warren – keyboards
Jay Bellerose – drums, percussion

Reception

The album received a generally favourable response from reviewers.

Videos
A video was produced for the track "Handyman Blues", directed by Johnny Vegas. Vegas also starred, alongside Bragg, Stewart Lee, Kevin Eldon, Phill Jupitus, Samuel West, Neil Morrissey, Ricky Grover and Ross Noble. The video depicts a group of men gathering in a DIY store to discuss their lack of practical skills and work through their fear of items in the store.

References

2013 albums
Billy Bragg albums
Albums produced by Joe Henry
Cooking Vinyl albums
Country folk albums
Country albums by English artists
Americana albums
Alternative rock albums by English artists